Namibiana latifrons, also known as the Benguela worm snake or Sternfeld's threadsnake, is a species of snake in the family Leptotyphlopidae. It is endemic to the southwestern coast of Angola.

References

Namibiana
Snakes of Africa
Reptiles of Angola
Endemic fauna of Angola
Taxa named by Richard Sternfeld
Reptiles described in 1908